Antodice sexnotata is a species of beetle in the family Cerambycidae. It was described by Franz in 1959.

References

Antodice
Beetles described in 1959